Boris Peter Bransby Williams (born 24 April 1957) is a French-born English drummer best known for his extensive work with the Cure (1984–1994).

Biography
Born in Versailles, France, he had previously worked with various artists, including Thompson Twins, Kim Wilde, Strawberry Switchblade and Tomato City. Williams is one of seven children; he has two brothers - Michael and Morgan - and four sisters - Juliet, Caroline, Mira, and Sarah. Williams dated Caroline Crawley, lead singer of Shelleyan Orphan.

Williams first joined The Cure in 1984 (first gig on 7 November in Minneapolis, Minnesota, USA), replacing Andy Anderson, who was fired for destroying a hotel room after a racially motivated incident with a security guard. During his tenure, Williams helped The Cure reach their critical and commercial peak recording the studio albums The Head on the Door, Kiss Me, Kiss Me, Kiss Me, Disintegration, and Wish.

He also appeared on the live albums Entreat, Paris, and Show as well as the videos for Staring at the Sea, The Cure in Orange, Play Out, Picture Show, Galore and Greatest Hits. He helped record the re-remixes album Mixed Up.

Williams left the band in 1994. His last concert was on 13 June 1993 in Finsbury Park at a benefit concert for London's XFM radio station. He started another band called Babacar with his then-girlfriend Caroline Crawley. He briefly reunited with The Cure for the acoustic recording of their Greatest Hits compilation in 2001, but he did not rejoin them officially. He was also present at some of the sessions for the Cure's 2004 album, simply titled The Cure.

Freaky Trigger once said of Williams: "[He] is a god among drummers due to his complete willingness to create an entire beat based on doing rolls on the various toms in his kit."

Discography
The Cure
 The Head on the Door (1985)
 The Cure in Orange (1986), VHS
 Standing on a Beach (1986)
 Kiss Me, Kiss Me, Kiss Me (1987)
 Disintegration (1989)
 Mixed Up (1990)
 Entreat (1991)
 Wish (1992)
 Paris (1993)
 Show (1993)
 Galore (1997)
 Greatest Hits (2001)

Thompson Twins
 Quick Step and Side Kick (1983)

Strawberry Switchblade
 Strawberry Switchblade (1985)

Robbie Nevil
 Robbie Nevil (1986)
Ian McCulloch
 Candleland (1989)
Drums on "The White Hotel" and "Proud to Fall"

Shelleyan Orphan
 Humroot (1992)
 We Have Everything We Need (2008)
Babacar
 Babacar (1998)

References

External links
Boris Williams bio
Boris at Pictures of You

1951 births
Living people
The Cure members
English rock drummers
Babacar (band) members
New wave drummers